Song for My Lady is a 1973 album by jazz pianist McCoy Tyner, his second to be released on the Milestone label. It was recorded in September and November 1972 and features performances by Tyner with saxophonist Sonny Fortune, bassist Calvin Hill, drummer Alphonse Mouzon with trumpeter Charles Tolliver, violinist  Michael White and percussionist Mtume joining in on two tracks.

Reception
The Allmusic review by Eugene Chadbourne states: "This is quite a fine collection of tracks and one of Tyner's six best albums."

Track listing
All compositions by McCoy Tyner except as indicated

 "Native Song" - 13:00
 "The Night Has a Thousand Eyes" (Bernier, Brainin) - 8:17
 "Song for My Lady" - 7:37
 "A Silent Tear" - 4:30
 "Essence" - 11:20

Tracks 1 and 5 recorded on September 6, 1972; 2, 3 and 4 on November 27, 1972.

Personnel
McCoy Tyner - piano, percussion
Sonny Fortune - alto saxophone, soprano saxophone, flute
Calvin Hill - bass
Alphonse Mouzon - drums
Michael White - violin (tracks 1 & 5)
Charles Tolliver - flugelhorn (tracks 1 & 5)
Mtume - congas, percussion (tracks 1 & 5)

References

McCoy Tyner albums
1973 albums
Milestone Records albums
Albums produced by Orrin Keepnews